The 2005 Women's French Pacific Handball Championship was held in Sydney, Australia between May 25 and 27, 2005, as part of the Women's Pacific Handball Cup.

The competition participants Tahiti, and New Caledonia. Wallis and Futuna did not send a team.

The winners were New Caledonia over Tahiti.

Results

Rankings

References

External links
 Archive on Tudor 66
 Oceania archive on Les Sport Info (French)
 Campeões Estaduais de Handebol (Spanish)

Pacific Handball Cup
French Pacific Women's Handball Cup
Women's handball in Australia
2005 French Pacific Women's Handball Cup
2005 in Australian sport